Pattalias palustre is a plant species in the family Apocynaceae, also known as Gulf Coast swallow wort. It was originally known as Cynanchum angustifolium and subsequently known as Seutera angustifolia before it was reclassified as Pattalias palustre by Fishbein in 2017. A perennial vine, it is found in areas of dunes, salt marsh, and coastal hammock within Florida and Alabama.

References

Asclepiadoideae
Flora of North America